The Alexander Airplane Company D-1 Flyabout was an early entry into the light aircraft market by the popular biplane aircraft manufacturer. The aircraft was later manufactured by Aircraft Mechanics, Inc.

Design
The D-1 was a conventional landing geared high winged monoplane with side-by-side seating powered by a  Continental engine, with a firewall-mounted fuel tank. The cabin featured doors on both sides of the aircraft. It was the first aircraft certified under new CAA rules for aircraft under .

Operational history
Test pilot Proctor Nichols later reported having flown through a tornado formation in the demonstrator returning from the Cleveland National Air Races.

Variants
D-1
First outfitted with a  Continental engine.
D-2
Improved model with Szekely engine.

Specifications (Flyabout D-1)

See also

References

External links
Alexander D-2 registrations

High-wing aircraft
Single-engined tractor aircraft